Lev Yakovlevich Rokhlin (1947–1998) was a career officer in the Soviet and Russian armies. Rokhlin reached the top of the Russian military, quickly rising through the ranks during and after the Soviet–Afghan War. After the Soviet Union fell, he started a political career and became a member of the Russian State Duma and the chairman of the State Duma's Defense Committee. He was shot to death in 1998 under mysterious circumstances.

Early career
Lev Rokhlin was the youngest of three children in the family of a war veteran, the political exile Yakov Lvovich Rokhlin. In 1948, eight months after the birth of his son, Yakov was arrested and apparently died in a Gulag prison. Lev’s mother, Ksenia Ivanovna Goncharova, brought up three children alone.

Ten years later the Rokhlin family moved to Tashkent. Rokhlin studied there at school #19 in Old Town. After he graduated, he worked at the Tashkent aircraft factory, then was drafted into the army.

In 1970 he graduated from the Tashkent Higher Military Command School with honors, then served in the Group of Soviet Forces in Germany in Wurzen. Then he studied at the Frunze Military Academy, and after completing his studies served in the Arctic and in the Leningrad, Turkestan, Transcaucasian
Military districts, as deputy commander of a corps.

Later service
In 1982–1984 he served in Afghanistan, initially as commander of the 860 Mechanised Infantry Regiment at Fayzabad, Badakhshan. In June 1983 he was released from this position after a failed operation and appointed deputy commander of the 191 Mechanised Infantry Regiment in Ghazni. But in less than a year he was reappointed to his previous position. He was wounded twice, and the second time was evacuated to Tashkent.

He graduated from the Military Academy of the General Staff with honors.

In March 1987 Rokhlin was appointed commander of the 152nd Motor Rifle Division, 31st Army Corps, in Kutaisi, a cadre division.

In November 1988 Rokhlin became commander of the 75th Motor Rifle Division of the 4th Army in Nakhchivan. In early 1990 the division was transferred to the Soviet Border Troops of the KGB, and Rokhlin was promoted to major-general in February of the same year.

In 1993, he became the head of Russia's 8th Guard Corps at Volgograd (formerly Stalingrad), at the rank of lieutenant general, the only Jew to reach such a rank in Russia since World War II.

During the First Chechen War, Rokhlin was credited with reorganizing the Russian forces in Chechnya and finally taking the Chechen capital of Grozny in 1995. Frustrated with the bloodshed, he left the army a few weeks later. He refused to accept the state's highest medal and the title of Hero of the Russian Federation for leading the Grozny offensive, saying "Its immoral to seek glory in a civil war for commanders. For Russia, the Chechen war has none of glory, but all of tragedy".

Political career
After he retired in 1995, Rokhlin was elected to the Russian parliament, the Duma, as a member of a pro-Boris Yeltsin party Our Home – Russia, from which he later resigned. Rokhlin chaired the Duma's Defense Committee until President Yeltsin made a rare agreement with the Communist Party to strip him of the post. In 1997, Rokhlin formed his own movement, called In Defense of the Army, which blamed Yeltsin for the war in Chechnya and for low morale in the military, unsuccessfully sought to organize serving and retired servicemen into a political force that could force Yeltsin from office.

Death
On July 4, 1998, a few months after he tried to stage an anti-government mass protest by army servicemen, Lev Rokhlin was killed in his bed by a gunshot to the head. Rokhlin's wife Tamara, who at first had briefly confessed to the killing "due to a hostile relationship", was convicted by a Russian court for her husband's murder in 2005, but she continued to insist he was killed by a group of masked men who broke into their dacha. She was given a suspended sentence of 4-5 years.

Three burned corpses were found in a windbreak near the scene of the crime. According to officials, they were killed some time before the murder of the general, and had nothing to do with that. But many of Rokhlin's colleagues thought that they were the real assassins, liquidated by the Kremlin's special service. According to Alexander Litvinenko, former KGB and FSB general Anatoly Trofimov (himself shot dead in 2005) told him that the murder appeared to be organized by Russian secret services.

See also
List of unsolved murders

References

External links
 Rokhlin's last interview, BBC News, July 3, 1998

1947 births
1998 deaths
20th-century Russian politicians
Burials in Troyekurovskoye Cemetery
Male murder victims
Second convocation members of the State Duma (Russian Federation)
Our Home – Russia politicians
People murdered in Russia
People of the Chechen wars
Russian Jews in the military
Russian lieutenant generals
Russian murder victims
Soviet Jews in the military
Soviet major generals
Soviet military personnel of the Soviet–Afghan War
Unsolved murders in Russia
Recipients of the Order of the Red Banner